Matt Walker may refer to:
 Matt Walker (American football), American college football and college baseball coach
 Matt Walker (drummer) (born 1969), American drummer
 Matt Walker (ice hockey) (born 1980), Canadian hockey player
 Matt Walker (soccer) (born 1992), American soccer player
 Matt Walker (swimmer) (born 1978), British Paralympian
 Matt Walker (Australian musician), Australian blues musician
 Matt Walker (cyclist), British downhill mountain biker

See also
 Matthew Walker (English cricketer) (born 1974), usually known as Matt Walker
 Matthew Walker (disambiguation)